During the Parade of Nations section of the 1952 Summer Olympics opening ceremony, athletes from each country participating in the Olympics paraded into the arena. The Parade of Nations was organized according to the Finnish name of the country. Greece led the parade followed by the Netherlands Antilles. Other countries marched by following the Finnish alphabet, except the host country, Finland, which marched last. The athletes from British Guiana and the People's Republic of China were absent from the Parade of Nations, meaning only 67 nations participated in the parade.

List

References

sports-reference.com

1952 Summer Olympics
Lists of Olympic flag bearers